"Home" is a song by Canadian rock band Three Days Grace. It was released on October 4, 2004 as the third single from their self-titled debut album (2003) via Jive Records. The song peaked at number 90 on the Billboard Hot 100 and was certified gold by the RIAA in 2018.

Background and release
"Home" was the third single released by Three Days Grace and, despite its radio success, it did not reach as high as its two predecessors on the music charts, peaking at number 90 in the United States. Nonetheless, "Home" was singer Adam Gontier's favorite song from Three Days Grace:
"['Home'] hits a spot with me. It's a fun song to play live as well. It's tough to pick a favorite, but because of the amount of energy we give it live, I'd say it's 'Home.'"

Drummer Neil Sanderson said, "It's about being pushed around and neglected and feeling like even though you're in the company of other people, they're not really there at all."

It was nominated for "Song of the Year: Alternative/Active Rock Radio" at the 2005 Radio Music Awards and won a BDS Spin Award based on the 100,000 spins it received in September 2005.

A promotional CD featuring the song and an interview with the band was included as a bonus with the Lords of EverQuest strategy guide published by Prima Games in 2003.

Music video
The original promotional video was shot as a montage of the band playing on tour accompanied by the song. It held little to no success and was not charted on MuchMusic's Countdown due to its low rotation.

The second and more familiar video, directed by Dean Karr, was produced a few months later. It starts with the band in the lobby of the then-abandoned Lister Block. The video shows a gothic girl walking throughout the building as if she was trapped in there and she could not find a way out while the band is playing in the lobby. Lead vocalist Adam Gontier is also seen screaming into a local telephone in the lobby. The girl eventually picks up a metal baseball bat and starts breaking windows and other things around the building. She eventually comes to the lobby where the band is playing and destroys the chandelier there. She then falls to the ground and is seen suffering because she could not find a way out.

Speaking about the music video, Sanderson said:

The video also features guitarist Barry Stock, who became a part of the band shortly after Three Days Grace was released.

Track listing

Charts

Weekly charts

Year-end charts

Certifications

Release history

References

External links

Three Days Grace songs
2003 songs
2004 singles
Jive Records singles
Song recordings produced by Gavin Brown (musician)
Songs written by Adam Gontier